Maryland Million Turf is an American Thoroughbred horse race held annually in October since 1986 primarily at Laurel Park Racecourse in Laurel, Maryland or at Pimlico Race Course in Baltimore. To be eligible for the Maryland Million Turf, a horse must be sired by a stallion who stands in Maryland. Due to that restriction the race is classified as a non-graded or "listed" stakes race and is not eligible for grading by the American Graded Stakes Committee.

The race is part of Maryland Million Day, a 12-race program held in mid October that was the creation of renowned television sports journalist Jim McKay. The "Maryland Million" is the first State-Bred showcase event ever created. Since 1986, 27 other events in 20 states have imitated the showcase and its structure.

From its inception in 1986 through 1995, the race was run restricted to only three-year-olds. The distance of the race from 1986 through 1992 was  miles. Since 1993 it has been a  mile competition and currently offers a purse of $125,000. Because of inclement weather the race was moved to the main track on dirt in 1992 and in 1995.

In its 30th running in 2015, the race is restricted to those horses who were sired by a stallion who stands in the state of Maryland. Both the entrant horse and their stallion must be nominated to the Maryland Million program.

Records 

Most wins: - Five horses have won the Maryland Million Classic twice:
 Phlash Phelps (2015, 2016)
 Roadhog (2012, 2013)
 Pocket Patch (2010, 2011)
 La Reine's Terms (2002, 2005)
 Winsox (1997, 1998)

Speed record: 
  mile : 1:46.03 - Forty Crowns (2007)
  miles : 1:42.40 - Wave Wise (1989)

Most wins by an owner:
 2 - Hillwood Stable (2015, 2016)
 2 - Ellendale Racing (2012, 2013)
 2 - Charles McGill (2010, 2011)
 2 - Sondra Bender - La Reine's Terms (2002, 2005)
 2 - Richard C. Granville - Winsox (1997, 1998)

Most wins by a jockey:
 4 - Horacio Karamanos (2002, 2006, 2008, 2012)

Most wins by a trainer:
 3 - John R. S. Fisher

Winners of the Maryland Million Turf since 1986

See also

 Maryland Million Turf top three finishers
 Maryland Million Day
 Laurel Park Racecourse

References

 Maryland Thoroughbred official website

Horse races in Maryland
Recurring events established in 1986
Laurel Park Racecourse
Recurring sporting events established in 1986
1986 establishments in Maryland